María de Jesús Patricio Martínez (born 23 December 1963), also known as Marichuy, is a Nahua traditional medicine healer and human rights activist in Mexico. She was chosen as "representative indigenous spokeswoman" by National Indigenous Congress (CNI) for the 2018 general election, for which she ran as an independent candidate for the Presidency of Mexico.

On May 28, 2017, a congress was held in San Cristóbal de Las Casas, Chiapas, where Marichuy was designated by the CNI as the "representative indigenous spokeswoman"  by 840 delegates from 60 indigenous communities of Mexico. The Congress also resolved to choose Marichuy as spokeswoman for the indigenous peoples of Mexico in the 2018 general election. Media reported that Patricio Martínez is the first indigenous woman to run for the Presidency of Mexico.

Early life and work 
María de Jesús Patricio Martínez was born December 23, 1963, in the Nahua community of Tuxpan, located in the present state of Jalisco. She completed high school for the purpose of dedicating herself to preserving her community by way of studying traditional medicines. After furthering these dreams to become a traditional doctor, she founded the Calli Tecolhuacateca Tochan Clinic in 1992. The health center supports the continuity and further development of Nahuan traditional indigenous medicine, an objective supported for decades by the University of Guadalajara. Marichuy is married to Carlos González.

Indigenous movement 
Marichuy is widely respected and, since 1994, a participant within the Zapatista indigenous movement, as well as a founding member of the National Indigenous Congress. "We think that compañera Marichuy doesn’t sell out, doesn’t give up and doesn’t surrender, as she was trained inside the CNI, we believe that," said one of the women of the Indigenous Governing Council (CIG) while reading the pronouncement of Marichuy's election.

In 2001, Marichuy spoke before the Congress of the Union about the situation of indigenous women nationwide. At that time, lawmakers directly and indirectly responsible for indigenous human rights violations in Mexico decided not to attend.

In May 2015, the Tuxpan Municipal Government Council delivered the Tuxpan Award of Merit to María de Jesús Patricio Martínez, allotted by the University of Guadalajara's Unit of Support to the Indigenous Communities (UACI), the Coordination of Linkage and Social Services.
The award was given to Marichuy in the area of Science and Culture, for her work in the House of Health for preserving traditional and herbal medicine.

Spokesperson and the Mexican presidency 
Altering a strategy which has rejected the Mexican state and its electoral politics, the Zapatistas announced in December 2016 their plans to elect a female spokesperson to represent the indigenous community as a presidential candidate. On May 28, 2017, Marichuy was elected by the National Indigenous Congress (CNI) as their spokesperson and representative for the presidency. Her campaign reflected both a displacement and an adherence to post-modern Zapatista politics –on the one hand, they reject state-power as a political goal; on the other, by endorsing Marichuy they joined an electoral competition of alternative state projects.

CNI's decision is also seen as a proposal for all Mexicans. "It’s an inclusive proposal, not only of the indigenous and with the indigenous, which makes the vindications of all the exploited, oppressed and discriminated of the earth its own, regardless of their ethnic or national origins and cultural characteristics. It’s not an essentialist or ethnic proposal. The proposal addresses all the peoples of Mexico, including the one of the majority nationality, that world where we all fit."

Officially recognized by the National Electoral Institute (INE) on October 15, 2017, Marichuy and the Council have begun collecting the required 866,593 signatures, throughout 17 states, during the subsequent 120 days. The INE digital signature process via cell telephone has revealed serious flaws weighted to benefit wealthier voters. Marichuy said, "the INE made a list of telephone makes and models so that you must have at a minimum an Android 5.0 operating system or higher and so many hours to begin with the download of the applications in the devices, we find that the list is not true; we find brands that are not included in the list and of those that are included they don’t all work. The download is tedious and can take hours." The INE declared each signature registration would take 4.3 minutes, but each actual signature registration has taken up to 16 hours, or more. 'With these "classist, racist and excluding measures," Marichuy said, you realize "that this electoral system is not made for those peoples below that govern ourselves and that the laws and institutions of the State are made for those above, for the capitalists and their corrupt political class, resulting in a big simulation."'

Marichuy has further stated, "as is the custom in our peoples, surrendering, selling out or giving up is not an option and we will redouble efforts to collect the citizen support required to figure as an independent candidate to the presidency of the Republic on the 2018 electoral ballot."

References 

Mexican human rights activists
Women human rights activists
1963 births
Living people
Nahua people
Independent politicians in Mexico
People from Tuxpan, Jalisco
Mexican women in politics
Mexican women activists
Zapatistas
Indigenous Mexican women